Abbasanta (literally "holy water") is a town and comune in the province of Oristano, Sardinia (Italy). It is located on the main road between Macomer and Oristano.

Description
The plateau arose from the lava flow of the Montiferru volcano.
The landscape of the lava plateau is characterised by pastures that are enclosed by stone walls that surround the  built in the 18th century. In the surrounding countryside, there are still some typical shelters made of stones and boughs by the shepherds.

In the village the stone houses are characteristic. They are low and with few floors, without sheds, but usually with a back courtyard where some space is reserved for the domestic animals. This is a quite common architectural dwelling in an area traditionally involved in sheep farming rather than agriculture.

The front room of the house is often a courtyard for chickens, in the centre of which there is the hearth, used for hanging and drying cured pork meat. Later, fireplaces replaced the hearths.

History
In Roman times, the town, called Ad Medias, was in the territory of the Æchilenenses or Cornenses.

The village was built all around the two churches of Santa Amada and Santa Caterina (dedicated to Catherine of Alexandria). There was a clear separation between social classes.

Until the 1950s the use of Italian and Sardinian language had distinct and complementary functions. Italian was the official language, used by the public administration, while Sardinian was the language spoken at home and among friends. The characteristic expressions of the dialect are usually inspired by the peasant and pastoral world. Many proverbs refer to the values of honesty, friendship, fidelity (of the woman), loyalty, parsimony and obedience to the divine will.

Main sights
The whole of the Abbasanta plateau is rich in archaeological sites. Very close to the village is the nuraghe Losa.

A country church is set on the site of Sant'Agostino (dedicated to Augustine of Hippo). Around the rural church, there are some characteristic small houses (in Sardinian language  or ) that host the pilgrims during the religious feasts.

References

Sources
Barrington Atlas of the Greek and Roman World, Map 48.

1934 establishments in Italy
States and territories established in 1934